Elisabeth M. Werner is a mathematician who works as a professor of mathematics at Case Western Reserve University, as associate director of the Institute for Mathematics and its Applications, and as maître de conférences at the Lille University of Science and Technology. Her research interests include convex geometry, functional analysis, probability theory, and their applications.

Werner earned a diploma in mathematics from the University of Tübingen, in Germany, in 1985. She moved to France for her graduate studies, finishing her doctorate in 1989 at Pierre and Marie Curie University, under the supervision of Gilles Godefroy. On completing her doctorate she took a faculty position at Case, and two years later added her affiliation with Lille. At Case, she was promoted to full professor in 2002.

In 2012, she became one of the inaugural fellows of the American Mathematical Society.

References

External links
Home page

Year of birth missing (living people)
Living people
20th-century American mathematicians
21st-century American mathematicians
French mathematicians
20th-century German mathematicians
American women mathematicians
Mathematical analysts
University of Tübingen alumni
Pierre and Marie Curie University alumni
Academic staff of the Lille University of Science and Technology
Case Western Reserve University faculty
Fellows of the American Mathematical Society
20th-century women mathematicians
21st-century women mathematicians
21st-century American women